The 2011 Milan–San Remo was the 102nd running of the Milan–San Remo single-day cycling race.

The race was won by  rider Matthew Goss, who was part of an eight-man group that battled for the victory, in a sprint finish. Goss finished ahead of 's Fabian Cancellara – the winner of the race in 2008 – and 's Philippe Gilbert, who completed the podium.

Teams
25 teams competed in the 2011 Milan–San Remo. Each team had been scheduled to start with eight riders, making a starting peloton of 200; but only 198 started the race. They were:

Results

References

External links

Milan–San Remo
March 2011 sports events in Europe
Milan - San Remo, 2011
Milan-Sanremo
2011 in road cycling